The Celebrity Circle for Stand Up to Cancer, a spin-off of The Circle, began on 9 March 2021 on Channel 4, and concluded following six episodes on 15 March. The series was confirmed in June 2020, and was filmed during Autumn 2020 in its usual location in Salford, England. Unlike the regular series, the celebrity players, if they decided to play as a catfish, were limited to playing as other celebrities.

On 15 March 2021, the series was won by Lady Leshurr, who had played the game catfishing as Big Narstie. She beat Saffron Barker in the final ratings, who finished as runner-up.

Format changes
Unlike previous series, Emma Willis delivered video messages to the players during the game informing them on upcoming twists. Ahead of the first blocking, the influencers had to decide which two players to put at risk, before ultimately deciding which one of them to block. For the second round, Willis announced that the three players which occupy "The Triangle" would be the players at risk of being blocked.

Players
The celebrities taking part in the series were revealed on 15 December 2020. In a slight difference in The Circle format, should they decide to catfish, the celebrity players must impersonate another famous figure.

Results and elimination

Notes

Viewing figures

References

2021 British television seasons
Channel 4 reality television shows
The Circle (franchise)